Thomas Johnston Turner (April 5, 1815 – April 4, 1874) was a U.S. Representative from Illinois.

Biography
Born in Trumbull County, Ohio, Turner completed preparatory studies.
He moved with his parents to Butler County, Pennsylvania in 1825.
He moved to Lake County, Indiana in 1837 and to Freeport, Illinois in 1838.
He studied law.
He was admitted to the bar in 1840 and commenced practice in Freeport.
He served as judge of the probate court of Stephenson County in 1842, Postmaster of Freeport in 1844, and State district attorney in 1845.
He established the first weekly newspaper (Prairie Democrat) in Stephenson County.

Turner was elected as a Democrat to the Thirtieth Congress (March 4, 1847 – March 3, 1849).
He served as member of the State house of representatives in 1854; he was speaker.

Turner was elected first mayor of Freeport, Illinois, in 1855.
He served as delegate to the peace convention held in Washington, D.C. in 1861, in an effort to devise means to prevent the impending war.
Turner enlisted in the Union Army May 24, 1861, and served as colonel of the Fifteenth Regiment, Illinois Volunteer Infantry. He resigned on account of ill health in 1862.

He served as member of the Illinois constitutional convention of 1863.
He was an unsuccessful Democratic candidate for United States Senator in 1871.
He moved to Chicago in 1871 and resumed the practice of law.
He died in Hot Springs, Arkansas, April 4, 1874.
He was interred in the City Cemetery, Freeport, Illinois.

References

1815 births
1874 deaths
Illinois state court judges
Speakers of the Illinois House of Representatives
Democratic Party members of the United States House of Representatives from Illinois
Union Army colonels
19th-century American politicians
19th-century American judges